Concessionárias is a Federal District Metro brazilian station on Green line. It was opened on 18 May 2004 on the already operating section of the line, from Central to Praça do Relógio. The adjacent stations are Águas Claras and Estrada Parque.

References

Brasília Metro stations
2004 establishments in Brazil
Railway stations opened in 2004